Miaoli County (Mandarin Pinyin: miáo lì xiàn; Hakka PFS: Mèu-li̍t-yen; Hokkien POJ: Biâu-le̍k-koān or Miâu-le̍k-koān) is a county in western Taiwan. Miaoli is adjacent with Hsinchu County and Hsinchu City to the north, Taichung to the south, and borders the Taiwan Strait to the west. Miaoli is classified as a county in central Taiwan by the National Development Council, while the Taiwan Central Weather Bureau classifies Miaoli as a county in northern Taiwan. Miaoli City is the capital of the county, and is also known as "Mountain Town", owing to the number of mountains nearby, making it a destination for hiking.

Name
The name Miaoli was coined by matching Hakka Chinese sound for the characters 貓貍 to the phonetically approximate Pali (Bari) from the Taokas language. The resulting word is a widespread but non-orthodox variant referring to Viverridae. In 1889, during late Qing rule, the name was modified from various forms to its current form.

History
Evidence of settlement in Miaoli dates back a thousand years. Many archaeological artifacts have been found showing that during the prehistoric era, people lived in the river terrace. They mainly led an agriculture life and engaged in hunting and fishing for their extra food source. About a thousand years ago, an indigenous group Taokas settled here.

In the mid-17th century, Han Chinese began to migrate into the area, beginning a gradual process of deforestation and establishment of permanent settlement sites. The prior inhabitants of Miaoli were either assimilated into the dominant Han population, or migrated deeper into the mountainous range. After several hundred years, Miaoli had become the home of people from different origins, such as Hakka, Hoklo, Atayal and Saisiyat.

Kingdom of Tungning
After Koxinga took over Taiwan from the Netherlands, he placed Miaoli into Tian-Sing County (天興縣) and started an immigration plan to develop this area.

Qing Dynasty
After the last Tungning Ruler Zheng Keshuang surrendered to the Qing Dynasty, Tian-sing County was renamed Zhuluo County. In 1889, Miaoli Hsien (苗栗縣) was established as an independent county under Taiwan Prefecture. At the end of the 19th century, thousands of acres of high-quality fertile fields had been reclaimed in the area of Nanzhuang, Shitan, Dahu and Zhuolan. Public and private schools were also established all over Miaoli which made the area a place of gathering intellectuals and elites in northern Taiwan.

Empire of Japan
From 1920 to 1945,  and six villages were under the jurisdiction of Byōritsu District, under Shinchiku Prefecture.

Republic of China
After the handover of Taiwan from Japan to the Republic of China on 25 October 1945, the present day area of Miaoli County was incorporated to Hsinchu County. On 16 August 1950, the government re-established Miaoli county with Miaoli Township as the county seat. On 25 December 1981, Miaoli Township was upgraded from township to a county-administered city.

Geography
Miaoli County is considered to be located in the central northern part of the island of Taiwan, contiguous with Hsinchu county, Hsinchu City, and Taichung City. The Xueshan Range is located on the border between Miaoli county and Taichung City. Miaoli county north to south averages about 50 kilometers and east to west averages about 64 kilometers. It is roughly diamond-shaped in appearance. The overall coastline of Miaoli is about 50 kilometers long.

Miaoli has little flat lands (plateau) and very mountainous due to the Xueshan Range. Miaoli has rich rainfall along with abundant rivers.

Administrative divisions

Miaoli County is divided into 2 cities, 5 urban townships, 10 rural townships and 1 mountain indigenous townships. Miaoli County has the second highest number of urban townships after Changhua County. Miaoli City is the county seat which houses the Miaoli County Government and Miaoli County Council. The incumbent Magistrate of Miaoli County is independent Chung Tung-chin.

Colors indicate the common language status of Hakka within each division. Note that Nanzhuang and Tai'an are also indigenous areas of Atayal people.

Demographics and culture

Population
The main population of Miaoli County is comprised by the Han Chinese and the Taiwanese aborigines. The Taiwanese aborigines constitute about 1.9% of the total population where the rural areas is where the Hokkiens are the main group in western urban areas of Miaoli, while the Hakkas comprise the main group of Han Chinese in the rural southern and central parts of Miaoli county

Taiwanese aborigines
The Saisiat currently reside in the Wufeng Township of Hsinchu County and the Nanzhuang Township of Miaoli County. Due to oppression by initial Han immigrants, the Atayal aboriginal group and the Nanzhuang Incident, the population of the Saisiat people has decreased to 5,000 people. It is the least populous Taiwanese aboriginal group after the Thao people. The traditions and culture of the Saisiat is greatly impacted by the Atayal aborigines and Hakka people in the region.

Han Chinese
During the Qing Dynasty, Miaoli was inhabited by Hokkiens in the coast and Hakka in the rural peasant mountainous areas. Currently, the inhabitants of the four coastal townships of Miaoli (Nanzhuang Township, Houlong Township, Tongxiao Township, and Yuanli Township) consists of primarily Taiwanese Hokkien speakers. With the exception of the four coastal townships and Tai'an Township, the main population consists of Hakka.

Sports
The main sports and recreational structures in Miaoli include Miaoli Sports Hall, Miaoli County Tennis Court, and the Park of Zhunan Township. In Taiwan National Athletic Games of 2011, Miaoli is ranked 21 out of 22 teams with 1 gold, 1 silver, and 8 bronze.

Economy
Popular regional agriculture, food production and culture promoted by the government include strawberries from Dahu Township, Hakka zongzi, Sanwan Chinese pears, Touwu Daikons, Sanyi wood sculptures, Tai’an persimmons, and many more.

In 2019, annual revenue of Miaoli County is NT$19.1 billion, while its annual expenditure is NT$18.9 billion. Monthly, Miaoli County Government spends NT$600 million on their staffs salaries and another NT$600 million for retirement obligation. As of July 2015, the county government has a debt of NT$64.8 billion.

On revenue, the county government received NT$9,572,442,000 from tax revenue (49.92% of all of its total revenue), NT$8,845,859,000 from subsidy and financial assistance (46.13% of all of its total revenue) and NT$283,792,000 from fines and compensation (1.49% of all of its total revenue). On expenditure, the county government spent NT$7,239,103,000 on education, science and culture (38.21% of all of its total expenditure), NT$4,457,682,000 for general and administration (23.53% of all of its total expenditure) and NT$2,267,660,000 on social welfare (11.97% of all of its total expenditure).

Education

Education-related affairs in Miaoli County is regulated by Education Department of the Miaoli County Government. At the end of 2004, the population of people older than 15 years old was 451,128, among which 97.91% of them were literate. There were 108,052 college-educated, 156,870 senior high school or junior college graduates, 176,755 junior high school or lower graduates. The percentage of people receiving education higher than college was relatively low.

Miaoli County houses several universities and colleges, such as the National United University, Yu Da University and Jen-Teh Junior College of Medicine, Nursing and Management.

Energy

Power generation

Miaoli County houses the gas-fired Tunghsiao Power Plant in Tongxiao Township, the second largest gas-fired power plant in Taiwan with a capacity of 1,815 MW. The county also houses Taiwan's first offshore wind power plant named Formosa 1 Offshore Wind Farm.

Water supply
The Mingde Dam in Touwu Township supplies water for irrigation and water supply for the county. The dam has a capacity of 17.1 million cubic meters.

Tourism
Tourist arrivals to Miaoli in 2011 was 17,000,000 people.

Tourist attractions

Nature
Nature tourism in Miaoli County including Flying Cow Ranch, Longfeng Fishing Port, Shei-Pa National Park, Waipu Fishing Port and Yongheshan Reservoir.

Museums and galleries
Miaoli County houses several museums, such as Huoyan Mountain Ecology Museum, Miaoli Ceramics Museum, Miaoli County Urban Planning Exhibition Center, Miaoli Railway Museum, Museum of Saisiat Folklore, Sanyi Wood Sculpture Museum, Taiwan Oil Field Exhibition Hall, Triangle Rush Exhibition Hall and Zaochiao Charcoal Museum.

Cultural centers
Cultural centers in the county include the Miaoli Park, Wu Chuo-liu Art and Cultural Hall, Wugu Cultural Village, Yingtsai Academy and Hakka Round House.

Entertainment centers
Entertainment centers in the county are Nanzhuang Theater and West Lake Resortopia.

Temples
Temples in the county are Zhonggang Cihyu Temple, Gongtian Temple, Shuntian Temple, Yuqing Temple, Miaoli Wenchang Temple, Xuanwang Temple and Maling Temple.

Festivals
The various cultural festivals of Miaoli County includes, Miaoli Marine Tourism, Meng-Hua Literary Award, Hakka Tung Hua Festival, Hakka folk song festival, Miaoli international tourism festival, etc.

Transportation

Rail
Miaoli Station of the Taiwan High Speed Rail is located in Houlong Township.

Miaoli County is also served by the Western Trunk Line and Taichung Line of the Taiwan Railways Administration.

Stations on the Coastal Line include:
 Qiding 
 Zhunan 
 Tanwen
 Dashan
 Houlong
 Longgang
 Baishatun
 Xinpu
 Tongxiao 
 Yuanli Station

Stations on the Taichung Line include: 
 Zhunan 
 Zaoqiao
 Fengfu
 Miaoli
 Nanshi
 Tongluo 
 Sanyi Station

Road
Both National freeway No 1 and National freeway No 3 pass through Miaoli County.

Relative location

References

External links

 

 
Taiwan placenames originating from Formosan languages